John Emory Toussaint Camper (1897 – November 21, 1977), born in Baltimore, Maryland was a prominent physician and Civil Rights activist. Raised in Sparrows Point, Camper was a graduate of Frederick Douglass High School. Prior to attending Howard University, Camper served in World War I, and during World War II, he was appointed to the Maryland Commission to Study Problems Affecting the Colored Population and served as a draft-board physician. While attending Howard, Camper was a star athlete in several sports, including football, and he was president of the school's chapter of the Phi Beta Sigma Fraternity.

After graduating from the Howard University Medical School in 1920, Camper worked as a physician at Provident Hospital in Baltimore, Maryland. In 1942, after the death of Private Thomas Broadus by the hands of police officer Frank J. Bender, Camper became a local civil rights activist. As one of the founders of MeDoSo, a black club for physicians and dentists that used their money and education to fight injustices, Camper was appointed to ask the local branch of the NAACP, which he helped to found, for assistance in investigating the death of Private Broadus. Camper also served in a leadership capacity for the Citizens' Committee for Justice; in May 1942, he organized transportation for over 2,000 participants for the CCJ's March on Annapolis. In 1943, Camper was appointed to the board of management at Crownsville State Hospital for the Insane. In 1948, Camper ran for Maryland's 4th Congressional district as a Progressive Party candidate, of which he was the state co-chair.

Camper died at the age of 83 and after fifty-seven years of medical practice on November 21, 1977.

References

1897 births
1977 deaths
African-American activists
African-American physicians
Howard Bison football players
Howard University College of Medicine alumni
Morgan State Bears football coaches
Physicians from Baltimore
Coaches of American football from Maryland
Players of American football from Baltimore
African-American coaches of American football
20th-century African-American sportspeople